The men's road race at the 1964 UCI Road World Championships was the 31st edition of the event. The race took place on Sunday 6 September 1964 in Sallanches, France. The race was won by Jan Janssen of the Netherlands.

Final classification

References

Men's Road Race
UCI Road World Championships – Men's road race
1964 Super Prestige Pernod